Acentrogobius pellidebilis is a species of goby found in Korea. This species reaches a length of 
.

References

Kim, I.-S., 1997. Illustrated encyclopedia of fauna and flora of Korea. Vol. 37. Freshwater fishes. Ministry of Education, Seoul, Korea. 629 p.

Acentrogobius
Taxa named by Ik-Soo Kim
Fish described in 1992